Meanwhile is the third studio album by German synthpop group Camouflage, released in 1991 by Metronome in Europe and Atlantic Records in North America.

Unlike Camouflage's earlier albums, and most of their later work, Meanwhile features more 'organic' instruments like real drums and guest musicians playing conventional instruments. However, this change brought with it controversy, and Marcus later said that if they had been given advice against the change in style, things may have gone differently.

Two singles were released from "Meanwhile: "Heaven (I Want You)" and a double a-side of "This Day" and "Handsome". "Heaven (I Want You)" charted at #57 in Germany.

Track listing
All tracks written by Camouflage, except lyrics on tracks 5 and 7 written by Nia Neutron.

 "Seize Your Day" – 4:37
 "Heaven (I Want You)" – 5:15
 "Mellotron" – 3:44
 "Mother" – 4:32
 "Dad" – 5:17
 "Where the Happy Live" – 4:05
 "These Eyes" – 3:41
 "What For?" – 3:16
 "Waiting" – 4:50
 "Accordion" – 5:03
 "This Day" – 3:56
 "Handsome" – 4:01
 "Bitter Sweet" – 4:19
 "Spellbound" – 4:45
 "Who the Hell Is David Butler?" – 4:13

Personnel
Camouflage
Heiko Maile
Marcus Meyn

Additional personnel
Gavin Harrison – drums

Mixed By – Colin Thurston, Tom Colley 
Mixed By [Assistant] – Eugene Ellis, Ron Aslan  
Photography By – Wolfgang Wilde  
Producer – Camouflage, Colin Thurston  
Recorded By [Assistant] – Matthew Ollivier

References

External links
 Album on the Official site
 Meanwhile at Discogs

1991 albums
Camouflage (band) albums
Atlantic Records albums